The women's points race during the second round of the 2009–2010 UCI Track Cycling World Cup Classics was the second women's scratch race in this season. It took place in Melbourne, Australia on 20 November 2009. 34 Athletes participated in the contest.

Competition format
A points race is a race in which all riders start together and the object is to earn points during sprints or to lap the bunch.

The tournament consisted of two qualifying heats of 10 km (40 laps). The top twelve cyclist of each heat advanced to the 20 km final (80 laps).

Schedule
Friday 20 November
12:00-12:20 Qualifying, heat 1
12:20-12:40 Qualifying, heat 2
19:30-22:00 Final
20:25-20:30 Victory Ceremony

Schedule from Tissottiming.com

Results

Qualifying

Qualifying Heat 1

Results from Tissottiming.com.

Qualifying Heat 2

Results from Tissottiming.com.

Final

Results from Tissottiming.com.

See also
 2009–2010 UCI Track Cycling World Cup Classics – Round 2 – Women's individual pursuit
 2009–2010 UCI Track Cycling World Cup Classics – Round 2 – Women's scratch race
 2009–2010 UCI Track Cycling World Cup Classics – Round 2 – Women's team pursuit

References

UCI Track Cycling World Cup Classics Round 2 Womens points race
UCI Track Cycling World Cup – Women's points race
UCI Track Cycling World Cup Classics Round 2 Womens points race